Euryops is a genus of flowering plants in the sunflower family. They are native mostly to rocky sites in southern Africa, with a few species in other parts of Africa and on the Arabian Peninsula. They produce daisy-like flowerheads from fern-like foliage. The name Euryops is probably a contraction of the Greek words  meaning 'wide,' and  meaning 'eye,' possibly referring to the large flowerheads compared to the narrow leaves.

 Species

 Gallery

References

External links

 
Asteraceae genera
Taxonomy articles created by Polbot